Raymond Frederick Sibille (born September 13, 1952, in Sunset, Louisiana) is a retired American Thoroughbred horse racing jockey. In a career that spanned thirty-five years, he rode his first winner on  June 29, 1969, at Evangeline Downs in Carencro, Louisiana. In 1973, he moved to compete at the Chicago-area tracks, where he won riding titles at Arlington Park, Hawthorne Race Course, and Sportsman's Park Racetrack. In 1981, he relocated to Southern California, where he won numerous top races. In 1988, trainer Thad Ackel hired him as the regular rider for Great Communicator, and Sibille met his greatest success that year, winning major races such as the Hollywood Turf Cup Stakes, San Juan Capistrano, San Luis Obispo, and San Marcos Handicaps before capping off the year with a win in the Breeders' Cup Turf. 

In 1993, Sibille returned to race in Chicago, where he competed until retiring on July 24, 2004. On November 8, 2004, the Illinois House of Representatives recognized his distinguished career and riding accomplishments. In 2005, he was voted the George Woolf Memorial Jockey Award, a one-time honor given annually by the members of the Jockeys' Guild to a jockey in North America who demonstrates high standards of personal and professional conduct, on and off the racetrack.

Sibille was a member of the Jockeys' Guild for more than thirty years and served on its Board of Directors as well as the organization's financial committee. He is an officer of the MacBeth Memorial Jockey Fund, which assists former jockeys experiencing hard times and the Andre Agassi Charitable Foundation for at-risk kids.

References
 February 20, 2005 at Bloodhorse.com on Ray Sibille being voted the George Woolf Memorial Jockey Award
 Ray Sibille at the NTRA

1952 births
Living people
American jockeys
Cajun jockeys
People from Sunset, Louisiana